Earl McDaniel may refer to:

 Earl W. McDaniel (1926–1997), professor of physics
 Earl McDaniel (DJ) (1928–2014), American disc jockey, actor and radio executive